Porto Ceresio (Varesino: Pòrt Cerési) is a comune (municipality) on Lake Lugano in the Province of Varese in the Italian region Lombardy, located about  northwest of Milan and about  northeast of Varese, on the border with Switzerland.

Porto Ceresio borders the following municipalities: Besano, Brusimpiano, Brusino Arsizio (Switzerland), Cuasso al Monte, Meride (Switzerland), Morcote (Switzerland). The Comune is situated not far away from the Cinque Vette Park

Demographic evolution

Twin towns
 Augustów, Poland

References

Cities and towns in Lombardy
Populated places on Lake Lugano